Xie Zhiyu (Simplified Chinese: 谢志宇; born 6 May 1987) is a Chinese football striker, who plays for Hangzhou Lücheng in the Chinese Super League.

Club career

Wuhan Guanggu
Xie Zhiyu started his professional football career with Wuhan Guanggu after graduating from their youth team in 2007.  The following season saw him steadily establish himself within the squad, however this was cut short after the sudden disbanding and relegation of Wuhan Guanggu in the Chinese Super League after the club's management did not accept the punishment given to them by the Chinese Football Association after a scuffle broke out during a league game against Beijing Guoan on 27 September 2008.

Hangzhou Lücheng
At the beginning of the 2009 season Xie Zhiyu transferred to Hangzhou Lücheng where he would make his competitive debut against Henan Construction on 5 April 2009 in a 2–0 defeat. Xie would have a difficult debut season and could only score one goal throughout the 2009 campaign, which led to him often finding himself playing as a substitute. When Wu Jingui was introduced as the team's new Head coach he moved Xie into midfield and the player would finally settle within the Hangzhou team as a regular.

References

External links 
Player profile at 7m.cn
Player profile at titan24.com
Player stats at sohu.com

1987 births
Living people
Footballers from Wuhan
Chinese footballers
Wuhan Guanggu players
Zhejiang Professional F.C. players
Chinese Super League players
Association football forwards
Association football midfielders
21st-century Chinese people